The Pakistan Naval Academy (PNA), PNS Rahbar, Manora is a federal military academy located in Manora, Karachi, Sindh, Pakistan.

Established in Manora, Karachi, under Vice-Admiral Syed Mohammad Ahsan in 1970, it is the one of the technologically advanced military training academy in Pakistan that offers professional academic degrees. Its functions and roles are similar to United States Naval Academy in Annapolis, Maryland, United States. And, it sends its students occasionally to United States Naval Academy for further advanced courses. Besides training its own officers, the academy has also provided basic training to about 2,000 officers of allied countries, including the Chief of Naval Staff of Qatari Emiri Navy.

Pakistan Naval Academy's commandant in 2021 is Commodore Sohail Ahmad Azmie.

Mission of Pakistan Naval Academy
“To impart moral, professional, educational and physical training to the cadets that imbues them with the 
highest ideals of integrity, duty, courage and honour in order to establish a sound base to become a proficient naval officer.”

Pakistan Naval Academy ISO certified
The Pakistan Naval Academy is "the first Armed Forces Academy in the country which has been certified to the international standards of quality (ISO-9001:2000)".

Quality policy of the Academy is:

"Pakistan Naval Academy aims to impart quality education and professional training to cadets that fulfill the requirement of Pakistan Navy. This is achieved through committed leadership, competent and devoted staff and progressive improvement in curriculum and training methodologies”."

History
In 1947, after the Independence of Pakistan, the Pakistan Navy lacked the capability and expertise to train its officers. Therefore, the Pakistan Navy sent its officers to be trained at the Britannia Royal Naval College, Britain. However, due to divergent operational requirements and cultural values, Pakistan was compelled to start its own training institute for its navy.
In 1961, the cruiser PNS Babur was converted into Cadets Training Ship. After the outbreak of the 1965 Indo-Pak War, PNS Babur was made available for operational requirements. There was now a need for a permanent institution for training navy officers. On December 1970, Pakistan Naval Academy was commissioned as PNS Rahbar at Manora.

Curricula
Even though, Academy got the status of degree awarding institute in 1965 and the degree of BSc  was used to be given.  The Naval Academy received accreditation as an approved "technological institution" in 1990. In 1990, Prime minister Benazir Bhutto signed an executive decree providing for the Bachelor of Science Degree for the Naval, Military, and Coast Guard Academies. The Academy was first affiliated with Karachi University for award of Bachelor of Science degrees in Naval sciences to its naval officers. The Status continued till 1997, when Premier Nawaz Sharif had awarded the full status of functioning Naval Academy. The same year, the Academy began to offer Bachelor of Engineering, Bachelor of Science, Bachelor of Business Administration programs.  In 1998, the commandant of the Naval Academy extended the authority to award the Bachelor of Science, Bachelor of Engineering, Bachelor of Business Administration degrees to all living graduates.

The Academy later replaced a fixed curriculum taken by all midshipmen with the present core curriculum plus 21 major fields of study, a wide variety of elective courses and advanced study and research opportunities.

Currently, the majors that are offered by the Naval Academy are:

Mathematics
Physics
Chemistry
Probability and statistics
Economics
English
Pakistan Studies
Islamic Studies
Biology
Oceanography
Engineering Mechanics
Engineering science
Electrical engineering
Applied science
Naval engineering
Engineering mathematics
Mechanical Engineering
Thermodynamics
Chemical Engineering
Marine engineering

Training
Cadets begin training by starting a year and half at the academy. They are initially taught three different disciplines:
Humanities
Professional
Engineering
Along with this they are also taught academic, professional and technical subjects.

After passing out they are appointed to midshipmen. In this phase, they go through another six months of training at sea. They are assigned to one of the four different branches including Operations, Weapon Engineering, Mechanical Engineering and Logistics. After passing the final fleet examination,  they are promoted to Sub-Lieutenant.

Affiliations
The academy is also affiliated with the following educational institutions:
Bahria University
National University of Sciences & Technology
Pakistan Navy Engineering College
Pakistan Educational Research Network

See also
Military academies in Pakistan
Pakistan Naval War College
Pakistan Marine Academy

References

External links
Pakistan Navy official website

Pakistan Navy
Naval academies
1970 establishments in Pakistan
Pakistan Naval Academy